Lewis Franklin Rush (12 September 1912 – 27 October 1999) was a Canadian cyclist. He competed in the time trial and the team pursuit events at the 1932 Summer Olympics. He was inducted into the Greater Victoria Sports Hall of Fame in 2007.

References

External links
 

1912 births
1999 deaths
Canadian male cyclists
Olympic cyclists of Canada
Cyclists at the 1932 Summer Olympics
Sportspeople from Victoria, British Columbia